Robert Elson Russell Sr. (December 18, 1941 – January 19, 2019) was an American politician. Elected to the Virginia House of Delegates in 1981, he faced Chip Dicks the following year after the court-mandated redrawing of districts. He was unsuccessful in this race but won election to the Virginia Senate in 1983.

Russell was convicted of embezzling $6,750 from a not for profit cycling club.  He was found guilty and sentenced to one year in prison.  Since convicted criminals are not allowed to serve in the Virginia Senate, he resigned his seat in 1994.

References

External links
 

1941 births
2019 deaths
Republican Party members of the Virginia House of Delegates
Republican Party Virginia state senators
Virginia Tech alumni
20th-century American politicians
Virginia politicians convicted of crimes